Peter Kelly (20 March 1901–1950) was an English footballer who played in the Football League for New Brighton and Notts County.

References

1901 births
1950 deaths
English footballers
Association football forwards
English Football League players
Chorley F.C. players
New Brighton A.F.C. players
Notts County F.C. players